Nicholas Victor Polizos (born August 12, 1947) is an American film, television and theatre actor. He is known for playing the recurring role of "Detective Frank Richmond" on four episodes of the American legal drama television series Boston Legal, with also being known for playing Joe Thomopolous in Who's the Boss? and as "Shep Cale" in Jericho.

Life and career 
Polizos was born and raised in the Montgomery, Alabama to Greek parents. He has two sisters, Sandra and Renee. Polizos attended at Robert E. Lee High School in Montgomery, Alabama, in 1964. He later attended at the Emory University in Atlanta, Georgia, where he studied in psychology, in 1967. After Polizos went to college, he didn't considered to study about acting. He auditioned for the Emory Theatre Department, while it had auditions for the stage play A Man for All Seasons, in which Polizos's name wasn't included into the cast listing. His role was the "Spanish ambassador Chapuys", in which he injured his leg. Polizos was later called from the casting director, being asked to play a part. He did well with his lines, in which the stage director provided him with a request.

Polizos was gonna take over the lead role of the character "Captain Sir Thomas Moore", in which he was later not right for the part, as he was told about that. He was cast on a college production, in which Polizos had a week to study his lines to becoming the character. Polizos received good reviews, as he later attended at Georgia State University, studying in psychology still. He left George State University, in which Polizos got an audition part from a director, recommending him to perform with a group, later moving to Philadelphia, Pennsylvania at the Temple University. Polizos then performed on a summer theatre program in Williamstown, Massachusetts. He also toured on the production called The History of Rock and Roll, in which Polizos later moved to New York to begin his career in theatre.

Polizos worked as a bartender in New York, in which he was about to give up his acting career in theatre. He then got a call from casting director, Meg Simon, in which Polizos was cast to playing the role of a "dockworker" and "sailor" in the Broadway play Anna Christie. In 1979, he starred in the Broadway play Whoopee!, where he played Mort". Polizos then began his film and television career in 1980, as he was offered the role of Billy Baylock in the film Brubaker. He later borrowed money from his father, in which Polizos moved to Los Angeles, California to earn some acting roles. In 1985, Polizos appeared in the television pilot called Condor.

Polizos guest-starred in numerous television programs including Married... with Children, Seinfeld, The Larry Sanders Show, Roseanne, The X-Files, Walker, Texas Ranger, Hill Street Blues, Malcolm in the Middle, NYPD Blue, Desperate Housewives, Family Ties, Modern Family, Mad About You, CSI: Crime Scene Investigation, The Practice, Grace Under Fire and The A-Team. He also appeared on commercials. In 2007, Polizos appeared in the film Randy and the Mob, in which he auditioned for the starring role of "Randy Pearson", though he had not noticed that the film would be shot in Atlanta, Georgia. Polizos is still continuing his acting career, mainly appearing on film and television.

References

External links 

Rotten Tomatoes profile

1947 births
Living people
American male film actors
American male television actors
American male stage actors
20th-century American male actors
21st-century American male actors
Emory University alumni
Georgia State University alumni
Temple University alumni
American theatre people